Arctotis frutescens is a species of flowering plant in the family Asteraceae. It is found only in Namibia. Its natural habitat is rocky areas. It is threatened by habitat loss.

References

frutescens
Flora of Namibia
Least concern plants
Taxonomy articles created by Polbot